Lorenzo Sorrentino (born 20 September 1995) is an Italian professional footballer who plays as a forward for  club Giugliano.

Career
Born in Rome, Sorrentino started his career in Serie D clubs Astrea (2 seasons), San Cesareo, Rieti and Sambenedettese. With Sambenedettese won the promotion to Serie C for the 2016–17 season. The forward made his professional debut on 11 October 2016 against Calcio Padova.

On 10 January 2018, Sorrentino signed with Juve Stabia.

On 3 August 2018, he was loaned to Lucchese. 

He left Gubbio on 1 June 2020, and signed with Renate.

In February 2021, he was loaned to Cesena.

After six months in Serie C club Vibonese, in January 2022 Sorrentino signed with Fidelis Andria.

On 5 January 2023, Sorrentino joined Giugliano.

References

External links
 
 

1995 births
Living people
Footballers from Rome
Italian footballers
Association football forwards
Serie C players
Serie D players
A.S.D. Astrea players
F.C. Rieti players
A.S. Sambenedettese players
S.S. Juve Stabia players
Lucchese 1905 players
A.S. Gubbio 1910 players
A.C. Renate players
Cesena F.C. players
U.S. Vibonese Calcio players
S.S. Fidelis Andria 1928 players
S.S.C. Giugliano players